Donald Jean Martineau (April 25, 1952 - March 26, 2006) was a Canadian professional ice hockey player. He played 90 games in the National Hockey League with the Atlanta Flames, Minnesota North Stars, and Detroit Red Wings between 1973 and 1977.

Career statistics

Regular season and playoffs

External links
 

1952 births
2006 deaths
Atlanta Flames draft picks
Atlanta Flames players
Canadian ice hockey right wingers
Detroit Red Wings players
Estevan Bruins players
Ice hockey people from British Columbia
Minnesota North Stars players
Kansas City Blues players
Kansas City Red Wings players
Omaha Knights (CHL) players
New Haven Nighthawks players
New Westminster Bruins players